John Flanagan (born 1947) is an Irish former hurler who played as a right corner-forward at senior level for the Tipperary county team.

Flanagan made his first appearance for the team during the 1967 championship and was a regular member of the starting fifteen until his retirement a decade later. During that time he won one All-Ireland medal, two Munster medals and one National Hurling League medal.

At club level Flanagan is a Munster medalist with Moycarkey–Borris. In addition to this he has also won two county championship medals.

References

1947 births
Living people
Moycarkey-Borris hurlers
Tipperary inter-county hurlers
All-Ireland Senior Hurling Championship winners